Castilleja pumila, the lancetilla del páramo, is a flowering species of plant in the family Orobanchaceae.

Distribution
Bolivia (South America),
Chile (South America),
Colombia (South America),
Ecuador (South America),
Peru (South America).

References

External links
 
 

pumila
Flora of northern South America
Flora of western South America
Páramo flora